Ti Poniro Mou Zitas (Greek: Tι Πονηρό Μου Ζητάς) is the second studio album by Greek singer Eleni Foureira. The album was released in Greece and Cyprus on July 1, 2012 by Minos-EMI S.A.

Singles
Ti Poniro Mou Zitas includes "Reggaeton", which was released before the album. Two further singles were released: ""All I Need", and "To Party Den Stamata".

Track listing

Chart performance

Release history

References

2012 albums
Eleni Foureira albums
Minos EMI albums